Dennis Edwin Showalter (February 12, 1942 – December 30, 2019) was a professor emeritus of history at Colorado College. Showalter specialized in German military history. He was president of the American Society for Military History from 1997 to 2001. In addition, Showalter was an advising fellow of the Barsanti Military History Center at the University of North Texas.

Career
Showalter began teaching at Colorado College in 1969. Showalter also previously taught at the United States Air Force Academy, the United States Military Academy, and the Marine Corps University. He wrote extensively on the wars of Frederick the Great, the German Wars of Unification, World War I, and World War II.

Awards and honors
1992 Paul Birdsall Prize for best new book given by the American Historical Association, for Tannenberg
2005 Samuel Eliot Morison Prize for lifetime achievement given by the Society for Military History
2018 Pritzker Literature Award

Selected works
"Manifestation of Reform: The Rearmament of the Prussian Infantry, 1806–13," The Journal of Modern History, Vol. 44, No. 3, September 1972
Railroads and Rifles: Soldiers, Technology, and the Unification of Germany. Hamden, Connecticut: Archon/Shoe String, 1975. 
Tannenberg: Clash of Empires, 1914. Hamden, Connecticut: Archon, 1991. . Repr. Washington: Brassey's, 2004. 
The Wars of Frederick the Great. London/New York: Longman, 1996. 
The Wars of German Unification. London: Arnold, 2004. 
Hindenburg: Icon of German Militarism. Military Profiles. Washington: Potomac, 2005.  (with William J. Astore)
Patton and Rommel: Men of War in the Twentieth Century. New York: Berkley Caliber, 2005. 
Armor and Blood: The Battle of Kursk: The Turning Point of World War II. Random House, 2013.

References

1942 births
2019 deaths
American military historians
College of Saint Benedict and Saint John's University alumni
Colorado College faculty
Historians of Germany
University of Minnesota alumni